Johnstraße  is a station on  of the Vienna U-Bahn. It is located in the Rudolfsheim-Fünfhaus District. It opened in 1994.

References

External links 
 

Buildings and structures in Rudolfsheim-Fünfhaus
Railway stations opened in 1994
Vienna U-Bahn stations
1994 establishments in Austria
Railway stations in Austria opened in the 20th century